Taurean Andre Manders (born 9 July 1986) is a Bermudian footballer who currently plays for the English club Whitchurch United.

Club career
Manders came through the local side North Village Rams before joining the US college soccer team Iona Gaels for which he played for four years. He later moved to the American IMG Soccer Academy in Bradenton, Florida.

In May 2011, he joined Capital City F.C. in the Canadian Soccer League. The following season, in May 2012, Manders transferred to York Region Shooters.

In February 2014, Manders joined the English side Bashley, but left at the end of the season to join Sholing.

International career
Manders made his debut for the Bermudian national team in a December 2003 friendly match against Barbados and had, by November 2015, earned 14 caps scored 1 goal. He has played in six FIFA World Cup qualification matches.

International goals
Scores and results list Bermuda's goal tally first.

Personal life
He is the son of ex-Bermuda national team cricketer Andre Manders.

References

External links
 Stephen Wright, "Manders waits for club ok to play in Caribbean Cup", Royal Gazette, 21 August 2012
 
 Stephen Wright, "Manders in ‘pick me’ plea to BFA bosses", Royal Gazette, 12 August 2011

1986 births
Living people
People from Hamilton, Bermuda
Association football midfielders
Bermudian footballers
Bermuda international footballers
IMG Academy Bradenton players
Antigua Barracuda F.C. players
Bashley F.C. players
Sholing F.C. players
USL League Two players
Canadian Soccer League (1998–present) players
USL Championship players
Bermudian expatriate footballers
Expatriate soccer players in the United States
Expatriate soccer players in Canada
Expatriate footballers in Antigua and Barbuda
Bermudian expatriate sportspeople in Canada
Bermudian expatriate sportspeople in the United States
Bermudian expatriates in Antigua and Barbuda
York Region Shooters players
Wessex Football League players